Natasha Sanaipei Tande (born 22 March 1985), popularly known as Sana, is a Kenyan singer, songwriter, actress, radio personality and entertainer.

Career 
In 2004, at 19 years of age, Sanaipei joined the Coca-Cola Popstars (East Africa) Talent Search after coaxing from her family.After successfully auditioning for the show, she deferred her Pharmacy studies at Kenya Medical Training College. Sanaipeiwon the competition alongside two other Kenyan contestants, Kevin Waweru and Pam Waithaka. Together, they formed the band Sema and won a record deal with Homeboyz Records. In 2005, the trio released a seventeen track debut album Mwewe, with hit singles Leta Wimbo, Sakalakata, and the eponymous Mwewe, thrusting them into the limelight. Later in the same year, the band split, citing "irreconcilable differences" and "external forces".

After the band split, then Capital FM Kenya Chris Kirubi asked former Hits Not Homework presenter Eve D'Souza to train Sanaipei as a radio presenter but eventually determined that she was not a good fit for the station. Shortly after, she joined Kiss 100, where she shadowed former Mid Morning Show presenter Angela Angwenyi and later began to present the Mid Morning Show and Keeping It Kenyan on Saturdays.

In 2012, Sanaipei left Kiss 100. She joined Easy FM (now Nation FM) in 2013 as co-presenter of the drive show alongside Edward Kwach. In 2014, she released her hit single Mfalme wa Mapenzi as part of producer Wawesh's Mahaba project, a showcase of Swahili love songs.The song earned Sanaipei widespread critical acclaim for her songwriting. Later, she began to host the mid-morning show alongside comedian Obinna Ike Igwe. When Obinna was transferred to the driveshow, Sanaipei became the sole host of the mid-morning show and garnered the station's largest listenership. In September 2015, Sanaipei and fellow presenters Ciru Muriuki and Anto Neo Soul were laid off. Their termination was met with uproar on social media platforms, with many listeners and fans demanding their reinstatement.

After leaving Easy FM, Sanaipei turned her focus to music, releasing singles such as Rasta Man, Simama Imara, and Ankula Huu. Her hit single, Amina, broadened her regional appeal and caught the attention of Tanzanian pop star and musician Chege Chigunda, who invitedher to Dar es Salaam to write and feature on his Najiuliza single alongside Tanzanian songbird Ray C.

2016–present 
After a cameo on NTV's Auntie Boss! and a recurring role on Maisha Magic's Varshita, both produced by Eve D'Souza's Moon Beam Productions, Sanaipei landed a starring role as the eponymous character in Rashid Abdalla's Aziza, a Swahili soap opera set in Mombasa. She continued her music career with a feature in Mombasa crooner Otile Brown's Chaguo La Moyo, which holds the record of most-watched Kenyan video on YouTube with over 30 million views. In 2020, they released their second collaboration, the hit single Aiyana.

On 5 March 2020, Sanaipei hosted her final karaoke at The Grove on Riverside and hung up her karaoke boots. She went on to release Mdaka Mdakiwa, Kunitema, and Yako. She also featured in Nadia Mukami's Wangu single off her African Popstar EP. The music video garnered 4 million views in its first week on YouTube and was dubbed the biggest Kenyan collaboration of the year. In October 2021, Sanaipei released her 6-track debut EP, Nabo, with features from Nyashinski and Khaligraph Jones.  Since 2020, Sanaipei has starred as Nana Tandala on Kina, a Kenyan adaptation of the South African television series The River, which airs on Maisha Magic Plus.

Discography

Studio Albums 
Nabo, EP, (2022)

Compilation Albums 
Sanaa (2020)

Singles

As lead artist

As a featured artist

Filmography

Television

References 

1985 births
Living people
21st-century Kenyan women singers
People from Mombasa